Rustamov is a masculine surname, its feminine counterpart is Rustamova. Notable people with the surname include:

Elman Rustamov (born 1952), Azerbaijani politician
Hasan Rustamov (born 1987), Tajikistani football player
Said Rustamov (1907–1983), Azerbaijani composer and conductor
Samad Rustamov, Uzbekistani sambo practitioner
Sardor Rustamov (born 1993), Uzbekistani archer
Tursunali Rustamov (born 1990), Kyrgyzstani footballer
Zebiniso Rustamova (born 1955), Tajikistani archer